Milabad (also, Yenimil’) is a village and municipality in the Beylagan Rayon of Azerbaijan.  It has a population of 2,196.

References 

Populated places in Beylagan District